Leonardo da Silva Costa (born March 9, 1985, in  Brazil), also known as Léo Carioca, is a Brazilian footballer.

Léo Carioca played for Democrata in the 2012 Campeonato Mineiro. He had previous spells in Switzerland with FC Winterthur and the Brazil national under-20 football team.

References

External links

1985 births
Living people
Brazilian footballers
Brazilian expatriate footballers
Esporte Clube Democrata players
FC Winterthur players
C.D. Juventud Independiente players
Expatriate footballers in Switzerland
Expatriate footballers in El Salvador
Association football forwards
Footballers from São Paulo (state)